Cathédrale du Sacré-Cœur d'Alger (Sacred Heart Cathedral of Algiers) is a Roman Catholic church located in Algiers, Algeria. Completed in 1956, it became the new cathedral in the capital after the Cathedral of Saint Philip of Algiers reconverted into a Muslim Ketchaoua Mosque. The Cathédrale du Sacré-Cœur d'Alger is the cathedral church of the Archdiocese of Algiers.

Construction of the church began after a wish of Bishop Leynaud in 1944. It was elevated to a cathedral in December 1962 and consecrated in 1963. The designers of the building, Paul Herbé and Jean Le Couteur, along with engineer René Sarger, were inspired by the Gospel of John. The church is noted for its central tower.

At the entrance to the nave there are small organs offered by the parish of Boufarik opposite which is a mosaic. The mural dates to 324, from the first Roman basilica of Castellum Tingitanum (Chlef). The altar is made of Carrara marble, and houses the relics of numerous African saints.

See also
Cathédrale du Sacré-Cœur d'Oran
Pro-Cathedral of Ghardaïa

References

External links
 Gallery of photographs
 Page on the cathedral

Roman Catholic churches completed in 1956
Tourist attractions in Algiers
Roman Catholic cathedrals in Algeria
20th-century Roman Catholic church buildings in Algeria